CEN/XFS or XFS (extensions for financial services) provides a client-server architecture for financial applications on the Microsoft Windows platform, especially peripheral devices such as EFTPOS terminals and ATMs which are unique to the financial industry. It is an international standard promoted by the European Committee for Standardization (known by the acronym CEN, hence CEN/XFS). The standard is based on the WOSA Extensions for Financial Services or WOSA/XFS developed by Microsoft.

With the move to a more standardized software base, financial institutions have been increasingly interested in the ability to pick and choose the application programs that drive their equipment.  XFS provides a common API for accessing and manipulating various financial services devices regardless of the manufacturer.

History 
Chronology:
 1991 - Microsoft forms "Banking Solutions Vendor Council"
 1995 - WOSA/XFS 1.11 released
 1997 - WOSA/XFS 2.0 released - additional support for 24 hours-a-day unattended operation
 1998 - adopted by European Committee for Standardization as an international standard.
 2000 - XFS 3.0 released by CEN
 2008 - XFS 3.10 released by CEN
 2011 - XFS 3.20 released by CEN
 2015 - XFS 3.30 released by CEN
 2020 - XFS 3.40 released by CEN

WOSA/XFS changed name to simply XFS when the standard was adopted by the international CEN/ISSS standards body. However, it is most commonly called CEN/XFS by the industry participants.

XFS middleware 
While the perceived benefit of XFS is similar to Java's "write once, run anywhere" mantra, often different hardware vendors have different interpretations of the XFS standard.  The result of these differences in interpretation means that applications typically use a middleware to even out the differences between various platforms implementation of XFS.

Notable XFS middleware platforms include:
 F1 Solutions - F1 TPS (multi-vendor ATM & POS solution)
 Serquo - Dwide (REST API middleware for XFS)
Nexus Software LLC - Nexus Evolution
 Nautilus Hyosung - Nextware
 Hitachi-Omron Terminal Solutions ATOM
 Diebold Agilis Power
 NCR - NCR XFS
 KAL - KAL Kalignite
 Auriga - The Banking E-volution- WWS Omnichannel Platform
 Phoenix Interactive VISTAatm Acquired by Diedold
 Wincor Nixdorf ProBase (ProBase C as WOSA/XFS platform - ProBase J as J/XFS platform)
 SBS Software KIXXtension
 Dynasty Technology Group - (JSI) Jam Service Interface
 HST Systems & Technologies - HAL Interface
 FreeXFS- open source XFS platform
 GRG banking eCAT (multi-vendor ATM terminal solution)
 TIS xfs.js implementation(open source for node.js community)
 TEB Orion

XFS test tools 
XFS test tools allow testing of XFS applications and middleware on simulated hardware. Some tools include sophisticated automatic regression testing capabilities.

Providers of XFS test tools include:
 Serquo XFS ATM Simulator Atmirage
 Serquo ATM Testing, Qarterback Qarterback
 Serquo XFS Tester
 Abbrevia Simplicity 
 Paragon VirtualATM Product Page VirtualATM Intro Video
 FIS ATM Testlab,  (was Clear2Pay, formally Level Four Software and Lexcel TestSystem ATM)
 KAL KAL Kalignite Test Utilities
 Dynasty Technology Group - JSI Simulators
 HST Systems & Technologies (Brazil)
 Takkto Technologies (Mexico)
 LUTZWOLF JDST - Testtool for J/XFS compatibility
 Afferent Software RapidFire ATM XFS

J/XFS 
J/XFS is an alternative API to CEN/XFS (which is Windows specific) and also to Xpeak (which is Operating System independent, based on XML messages). J/XFS is written in Java with the objective to provide a platform agnostic client-server architecture for financial applications, especially peripheral devices used in the financial industry such as EFTPOS terminals and ATMs.

With the move to a more standardized software base, financial institutions have been increasingly interested in the ability to pick and choose the application programs that drive their equipment. J/XFS provides a common Object Oriented API between a pure Java application and a wide range of financial devices, providing a layer of separation between application and device logic that can be implemented using a native J/XFS API or wrapping an existing implementation in JavaPOS or CEN/XFS.

J/XFS was developed by the companies De La Rue, IBM, NCR, Wincor Nixdorf and Sun Microsystems and is now hosted, monitored and maintained by the European Committee for Standardization, CEN.

See also 
 Xpeak - Devices Connectivity using XML (Open Source Project).
 Automated teller machine
 Teller assist unit

External links 
 CEN/XFS Home Page

Windows communication and services
Device drivers
Embedded systems
Application programming interfaces
Microsoft application programming interfaces
Banking technology